The fourth season of Offspring, an Australian drama television series, premiered on 22 May 2013 on Network TEN. The season concluded after 13 episodes. Offspring is the story of the impossible loves of 30-something obstetrician Nina Proudman (Asher Keddie), and her fabulously messy family, as they navigate the chaos of modern life.

Cast

Regular
Asher Keddie as Nina Proudman
Kat Stewart as Billie Proudman
Matthew Le Nevez as Patrick Reid
Deborah Mailman as Cherie Butterfield (up to ep. 4)
Eddie Perfect as Mick Holland
Richard Davies as Jimmy Proudman
Linda Cropper as Geraldine Proudman
with Lachy Hulme as Martin Clegg
and John Waters as Darcy Proudman (up to ep. 4, recurring thereafter)

Recurring
Jane Harber as Zara Perkich
Alicia Gardiner as Kim Akerholt
Kate Jenkinson as Kate Reid
Henry & Jude Schimizzi Peart as Ray Proudman
Ido Drent as Lawrence Pethbridge
Caren Pistorius as Eloise Ward
Kevin Hofbauer as Joseph Green
Ben & Sam Hunter, Teah Whalan, Cleo Mete as Alfie Proudman

Guest starring
Kamahl as Dr. Bandari
Robbie Magasiva as Ugly Pete

Special guest starring
Garry McDonald as Phillip Noonan
Clare Bowditch as Rosanna Harding

Episodes

Ratings 

Figures are OzTAM Data for the 5 City Metro areas.
Overnight - Live broadcast and recordings viewed the same night.
Consolidated - Live broadcast and recordings viewed within the following seven days.

References

2013 Australian television seasons